The 1919 Florida Gators football team represented the University of Florida in the sport of American football during the. 1919 college football season. It was Alfred L. Buser's third and last as the head coach of the Florida Gators football team.

Florida students, fans and alumni had learned to suffer through football losses to major Southern Intercollegiate Athletic Association (SIAA) opponents like the Georgia Bulldogs and Tulane Green Wave, but the 7–0 loss to the Florida Southern was viewed by many as an unacceptable failure.  Nevertheless, Buser's 1919 Florida Gators completed their football season with an improved overall record of 5–3 and an SIAA conference record of 2–2.

Before the season
George B. Sparkman, Jr. assisted the Gators.

The team's captain was Jim Sparkman, who returned from World War I service with the Rainbow Division after playing for Florida from 1914 to 1916. Rondo Hatton was a substitute quarterback on the team.

Schedule

Season summary

Georgia A&M
The season opened with a 33–2 defeat of Georgia A&M.

The starting lineup was Clemons (left end), Wuthrich (left tackle), Connell (left guard), Perry (center), Baker (right guard), Goldsby (right tackle), Thomas (right end), B. Anderson (quarterback), C. Anderson (left halfback), Sparkman (right halfback), Olson (fullback).

Mercer

Sources:

In spite of rain and mud, the Gators beat the Mercer Baptists 48–0. Three hundred students led a parade in Gainesville afterwards. No extra points were kicked all game due to the wet condition of the ball. Florida scored first on a 40-yard touchdown run from C. Anderson.

The starting lineup was Clemons (left end), Wuthrich (left tackle), Connell (left guard), Perry (center), Baker (right guard), Goldsby (right tackle), Thomas (right end), B. Anderson (quarterback), C. Anderson (left halfback), Sparkman (right halfback), Merrin (fullback).

Georgia

Sources:

Tootie Perry had a breakout game in a 16–0 loss to the Georgia Bulldogs on Plant Field, dueling with Georgia center Bum Day. The Gators kept the game close for three quarters.

The starting lineup was Thomas (left end), Goldsby (left tackle), Baker (left guard), Perry (center), Connell (right guard), Wuthrich (right tackle), Clemons (right end), Hatton (quarterback), Anderson (left halfback), Sparkman (right halfback), Merrin (fullback).

Florida Southern

Sources:

In the 7–0  upset loss to Florida Southern, captain Jim Sparkman seemed the only one to draw praise.

The starting lineup was Clemons (left end), Baker (left tackle), Norton (left guard), Perry (center), Gunn (right guard), Goldsby (right tackle), Thomas (right end), B. Anderson (quarterback), C. Anderson (left halfback), Sparkman (right halfback), Stanley (fullback).

Tulane

Sources:

Tulane beat the Gators 14–2 with its swift backfield. The Gators led 2–0 at the half. In the third periods, Tulane's Williams completed a pass for a touchdown. In the fourth period, Fields ran for a touchdown on a 30-yard end run.

Stetson
Florida romped over Stetson 64–0. The Hatters resorted to using the forward pass.

South Carolina

Sources:

The Gators line tore through the South Carolina Gamecocks in a 13–0 victory. Crom Anderson made the first touchdown on a 15-yard reception. In the third quarter, Merrin rushed through the line and blocked a punt, and Baker fell on Florida's second touchdown.

The starting lineup was Swanson (left end), Baker (left tackle), Wuthrich (left guard), Perry (center), Connell (right guard), Goldsby (right tackle), Thomas (right end), B. Anderson (quarterback), C. Anderson (left halfback), Sparkman (right halfback), Merrin (fullback).

Oglethorpe

Sources:

To close the season, the Gators defeated Oglethorpe 14–7. Despite the score and being outweighed, Oglethorpe outplayed the Gators.  Oglethorpe's touchdown came conventionally, and both Florida scores were off turnovers: the first after a fumble and the second after a blocked punt.

The starting lineup was Clemons (left end), Baker (left tackle), Wuthrich (left guard), Perry (center), Connell (right guard), Goldsby (right tackle), Thomas (right end), B. Anderson (quarterback), Sparkman (left halfback), C. Anderson (right halfback), Merrin (fullback).

Postseason
Al Buser finished his three-year tenure as the Gators' athletic director and football coach with an overall record of 7–8, and he later became the athletic director for Hamline University.

Personnel

Line

Backfield

References

Bibliography
 

Florida
Florida Gators football seasons
Florida Gators football